Myaing Gyi Ngu is a village in the Hpa-an District of Kayin State, Myanmar. It is the location of an IDP camp sheltering over 5,000 people.

The late U Thuzana holds the title Myaing Gyi Ngu Sayadaw in the village.

References 

Populated places in Kayin State